His Eminence (abbreviation H.Em. or HE) is a style of reference for high nobility, still in use in various religious contexts.

Catholicism
The style remains in use as the official style or standard form of address in reference to a cardinal of the Catholic Church, reflecting his status as a Prince of the Church.

A longer, and more formal, title is "His (or Your when addressing the cardinal directly) Most Reverend Eminence".

Patriarchs of Eastern Catholic Churches who are also cardinals may be addressed as "His Eminence" or by the style particular to Catholic patriarchs, His Beatitude.

When the Grand Master of the Sovereign Military Order of Malta, the head of state of their sovereign territorial state comprising the island of Malta until 1797, who had already been made a Reichsfürst (i.e., prince of the Holy Roman Empire) in 1607, became (in terms of honorary order of precedence, not in the actual church hierarchy of ordained ministers) the most senior official after the most junior member of the cardinals in 1630, he was also awarded the hybrid style His Most Eminent Highness (abbreviation HMEH) to recognize his status as a type of Prince of the Church.

The Prince and Grand Master of the contemporary Sovereign Military Order of Malta is still styled His Most Eminent Highness. Styles such as "His Grand Eminence" or "His Eminent Grace" amongst others were used as well, some formalized by the pope or other powers, such as monarchs. However, many others were simply the personal preference of the cardinal and by the merit of other earthly offices. 
 
While the term is shunned by many individuals of other faiths or denominations of Christianity, the title is officially maintained in international diplomacy without regard for its doctrinal, philosophical and theological origins.

Eastern Orthodox Church
Archbishops under the Ecumenical Patriarchate and metropolitans in the Eastern Orthodox Church are addressed with the style of "Eminence". Archbishops of independent churches are addressed with the style of "Beatitude". Titular metropolitans are addressed with the style of "Excellency".

The Ecumenical Patriarch of Constantinople is styled "His All-Holiness", and so is, exceptionally, the Metropolitan Bishop of Thessaloniki. The patriarchs of Alexandria, Antiochia and Jerusalem, as well as the Serbian, Bulgarian and Russian patriarchs are referred to as "His Holiness", while Romanian Patriarchs are referred to as "His Beatitude". The patriarch of the Georgian Orthodox Church is a unique exception, being addressed as "His Holiness and Beatitude".

Oriental Orthodoxy
In Oriental Orthodoxy, bishops holding the rank of metropolitan are referred to as "His Eminence".

In Syriac Orthodox Church the Catholicose of India who is also the Maphrian of the East is referred to as "His Beatitude Catholicose".

Other religions
In the Philippine Independent Church, an Independent Catholic and Anglo-Catholic denomination, the supreme bishops, who are the church's head primates, are referred to as "His Eminence" and "Your Eminence" in their official form of address or style.

In Tibetan Buddhism and Bön, His Eminence/Your Eminence is the English translation of several Tibetan titles (e.g., Khentin) which signify associate lineage holders and regents of lineages. If the lineage holder of any particular lineage is referred to in English as His Holiness, then the teachers immediately subordinate will usually be accorded the English title His Eminence. For example, in the Karma Kagyu, His Holiness the 16th Gyalwa Karmapa had 4 principal disciples who held regency until the enthronement of the 17th Karmapa. Each of these 4 high lamas hold/held the title His Eminence. In the Southern Drukpa Kagyu in Bhutan, the Five Lopons of the Zhung Dratshang are styled "Their Eminences".

It is also used, often informally (perhaps as a rendering of an oriental style), in Islam for highly honorable religious leaders. For example, an Ayatollah or Marja' in Shia, Imam of the Sunni Barelwi school of thought, Grand Master of the Murjite Order, Moulana Syed Madani Mia, is often addressed with this title, along with individuals such as Moulana Khushtar Siddiqi of Mauritius, although these titles are, in essence, unofficial. Beyond this, the traditional rulers of the sub-national states of the Fulani, Hausa, Nupe and Kanuri peoples of Nigeria use the style as an alternative to the HRH style that is usually used by the country's royal monarchs, highlighting by so doing their positions as spiritual as well as temporal leaders. The Lord of the Rasulid Order is styled His Most Eminent Royal Highness (abbreviated HMERH).

See also
Ecclesiastical address
, nickname for Italian broadcaster and politician Silvio Berlusconi

Notes
aCatholic Encyclopedia recommends using this form for ending a formal letter to an Italian cardinal: "Embracing the purple of His Most Reverend Eminence, I am His Eminence's very humble and obedient servant."

References

External links

Ecclesiastical styles
Cardinals (Catholic Church)
Royal styles